Vishwaroopam is a 2013 Indian espionage action thriller film.

Vishwaroopam may also refer to:

 Vishwaroopam (1978 film), a Malayalam Indian film directed by Narayanan P V & Vasudevan T K
 Vishwaroopam (1980 film), a Tamil Indian film directed by A. C. Tirulokchandar
 Viswaroopam (1981 film), a Telugu philosophy film
 Vishwaroopam II, a 2018 Tamil-language film directed by Kamal Haasan
 Vishwaroopam (soundtrack), a soundtrack of the 2013 film directed by Kamal Haasan
 Controversies related to Vishwaroopam, controversies happened on the 2013 released film directed by Kamal Haasan